BRMalls, styled as brMalls, is a Brazilian company that operates in the business of shopping center management, with participation in 31 shoppings in all regions of Brazil. The company was founded in 2006, after a partnership between GP Investments and Equity International in the acquisition of ECISA, Dacom and Egec. It is currently one of the largest shopping mall operators in the country.

BRMalls has been registered on the BOVESPA Novo Mercado since 2006, under the code BRML3. The company is also listed on the New York Stock Exchange under the codes BRMLL and BRMSY.

References

External links
BRMalls Official Website

Companies based in Rio de Janeiro (state)
Companies listed on B3 (stock exchange)